Mõksi is a settlement in Võru Parish, Võru County in southeastern Estonia.

References

Villages in Võru County